Finland is divided into 19 regions.

The regions are governed by regional councils that serve as forums of cooperation for the municipalities of each region. The councils are composed of delegates from the municipal councils. The main tasks of regional councils are regional planning, the development of enterprises, and education. Between 2004 and 2012, the regional council of Kainuu was elected via popular elections as part of an experimental regional administration. 

In 2022 new wellbeing services counties were established as part of a health care and social services reform. The wellbeing services counties follow the regional borders, and are governed by directly elected county councils.

Åland 
One region, Åland, has a special status and has a much higher degree of autonomy than the others, with its own Parliament and local laws, due to its unique history and the fact that the overwhelming majority of its people are Finland Swedes. The sole language of Åland is Swedish/Finland Swedish, unlike the rest of the country where Finnish and Swedish share official status. It has its own elected head of government who carries the title of Premier and heads the Lantråd, the regional executive. Most powers that would be exercised by the Government of Finland on the mainland are instead exercised by Åland-specific authorities which execute independent policy in most areas. The Åland islanders elect a single representative to the national legislature, while the Government of Finland appoints a Governor to represent the national government on Åland. Åland is a demilitarized zone and Åland islanders are exempt from conscription.

Representation of the state 
In addition to inter-municipal cooperation, which is the responsibility of regional councils, there are 15 Centres for Economic Development, Transport and the Environment (Finnish: elinkeino-, liikenne- ja ympäristökeskus, abbreviated ely-keskus), which is responsible for the local administration of labour, agriculture, fisheries, forestry and entrepreneurial affairs. They are each responsible for one or more of regions of Finland, and include offices of the Ministries of Employment and the Economy, Transport and Communications and Environment. The Finnish Defence Forces regional offices are responsible for the regional defence preparations and for the administration of conscription within the region.

List of regions

Former region

Regional border changes

1997 

 Kiikoinen transferred from Pirkanmaa to Satakunta.

2001 

 Kuorevesi transferred from Pirkanmaa to Central Finland by merging with Jämsä.

2002 

 Kangaslampi transferred from South Savo to North Savo.

2005 

 Punkalaidun transferred from Satakunta to Pirkanmaa.

2007 

 Längelmäki merged with Orivesi in Pirkanmaa and Jämsä in Central Finland.

2010 

 Himanka transferred from Central Ostrobothnia to North Ostrobothnia by merging with Kalajoki.
 Part of Ruotsinpyhtää in Eastern Uusimaa transferred to Pyhtää in Kymenlaakso.

2013 

 Kiikoinen transferred from Satakunta to Pirkanmaa by mergin with Sastamala.
 Suomenniemi transferred from South Karelia to South Savo by merging with Mikkeli.

2016 

 Vaala transferred from Kainuu to North Ostrobothnia.

2021 

 Heinävesi transferred from South Savo to North Karelia.
 Iitti transferred from Kymenlaakso to Päijät-Häme.
 Isokyrö transferred from Ostrobothnia to South Ostrobothnia.
 Joroinen transferred from South Savo to North Savo.
 Kuhmoinen transferred from Central Finland to Pirkanmaa.

See also 
Municipalities of Lapland
Regions of Northern Finland
Regions of Eastern Finland
Regions of Western and Central Finland
Regions of South-Western Finland
Regions of Southern Finland
Municipalities of Åland
County Councils of Sweden
Household pennants of Finland
ISO 3166-2:FI
Regional State Administrative Agency
List of Finnish regions by GDP

Notes

References

External links 

Regional Councils of FinlandOfficial website
Regional State Administrative Agencies

 
Subdivisions of Finland
Regions
Finland 1
Regions, Finland